
UCI Track Cycling World Championships in motor-paced racing were conducted between 1893 and 1992 for amateurs and 1895–1994 for professionals. These are the results:

Amateurs (1893–1992)

 In 1988 Vincenzo Colamartino and Roland Renn were disqualified for doping.

Professionals (1895–1994)

Source:

References

Track cycling races
UCI motor-paced